Bocula is a genus of moths in the family Erebidae. The genus was erected by Achille Guenée in 1852.

Description
Its palpi are slender and reaching vertex of head, where the third joint is minute. Thorax and abdomen smoothly scaled. Tibia fringed with hair. Forewings with rounded apex. Hindwings with vein 5 from lower angle of cell.

Species

References

Rivulinae
Noctuoidea genera